Ners is a commune in the Gard department in southern France.

History
Ners is part of a territory inhabited long before the Roman presence in the region.

The village is located along the ancient road 'voie Régordane' going from Saint-Gilles to Puy-en-Velay. Along this road traders, pilgrims, crusaders and knights crossed the river Gardon.

In 1211 Ners is first time reported as a place of residence with the "castrum nercium" - a watchtower of the twelfth century. This tower was probably constructed as an outpost to the village of Vezenobres as well as to protect the few inhabitants of the village. The tower was gradually expanded and in 1480 it retained its castle walls and is to be considered the oldest building in the village.

Etymology
Etymologically the name can be derived from "Nertius", a Gallo-Roman person with great prestige in ancient times. A manuscript from 1247 mentions the name "Nercium" and in 1547 "Ners".

Population

See also
 The village of Ners
Communes of the Gard department

References

Communes of Gard